David Sheffield (born 1948) is an American comedy writer best known for his writing on Saturday Night Live and the screenplays for Coming to America, Coming 2 America, and The Nutty Professor all written in collaboration with Barry W. Blaustein.

Writing credits
Saturday Night Live (1980-1983) (TV)
Police Academy 2: Their First Assignment (1985)
Coming to America (1988)
What's Alan Watching? (1989) (TV)
Boomerang (1992)
The Nutty Professor (with Tom Shadyac and Steve Oedekerk) (1996)
The Gelfin (1999) (unproduced)
Nutty Professor II: The Klumps (2000)
The Honeymooners (2005)
Coming 2 America (2021)

References

External links

American male screenwriters
1948 births
Living people